Varsha is a 2005 Indian Kannada-language comedy-drama film written and directed by S. Narayan, produced by Rockline Venkatesh under the banner of Rockline Productions. It stars Vishnuvardhan in the lead role with Ramesh Aravind, Anu Prabhakar and Manya in supporting roles. The film is the remake of the 1996 blockbuster Malayalam-language film Hitler. The story centers around the life of Satyamurthy (Vishnuvardhan), known for his tough character, domineering personality and uncontrolled rage at the youngsters of the area, for stalking his five young sisters. The film features original songs composed by S. A. Rajkumar. The film was a blockbuster, running for 200 days in multiple centers across Karnataka thus becoming the highest grossing Kannada film of the year.

Plot
Sathya has come up in life the hard way as he lost his mother when he was a small boy and his father was framed and arrested on criminal charges. Sathya, unaware of his father's innocence, takes custody of his five young sisters. Sathya's father Bhadra was cheated by his brother-in-law who poisons his sister's mind to leave her husband, but she commits suicide later and her son Sathya is left with his five sisters. Sathya takes care of his sisters well and educates them, but they are under his strict control and any person who plays foul with them faces his wrath, but he finds himself in trouble because of this tough character. Meanwhile, Sathya's father is released from prison and now wants to take revenge on his brother-in-law but the latter joins hands with some villains who want to settle scores with Bhadra and his son. They hatch a plan to create a rift in Sathya's family which, surprising everyone, succeeds. Will Sathya reunite his family again, and prove his father's innocence?

Cast

Soundtrack

S. A. Rajkumar composed the film's background score and music for its soundtrack, with the lyrics written by S. Narayan. The soundtrack album consists of six tracks.

References

2005 films
2000s Kannada-language films
Indian action films
Films directed by S. Narayan
Kannada remakes of Malayalam films
Rockline Entertainments films
2005 action films